Diego Carlos Santos Silva (born 15 March 1993), known as Diego Carlos, is a Brazilian professional who plays as a defender for English club Aston Villa.

Club career

Early career
Carlos began his senior career with Desportivo Brasil. In September 2012, Carlos signed for São Paulo, playing for their B-Team.

He went on to sign for Paulista and Madureira for loan spells.

Estoril and Porto loan
On 2 July 2014, Carlos signed for Portuguese club Estoril. He spent one year with their development team before going on loan to FC Porto B. He went on to make 19 appearances with them in the Liga Portugal 2. After his loan move, Carlos featured for Estoril in the Primeira Liga - scoring his first goal for the club on 25 October 2015. in a 2–2 draw against Rio Ave.

Nantes
In June 2016, it was announced Carlos would join FC Nantes on a five-year contract. The transfer fee paid to Estoril was an estimated €2 million. He made his debut for Nantes on 25 October 2016, in a 2–1 victory over Angers in the Coupe de la Ligue. His first goal for the club came on 12 February 2017, in a 3–2 Ligue 1 victory over Marseille.

On 14 January 2018, during a Ligue 1 match between Nantes and Paris Saint-Germain, referee Tony Chapron appeared to kick Carlos following a collision before sending him off for a second bookable offence. Chapron, who was suspended by the French Football Federation, admitted his mistake and asked for Carlos' second yellow card to be rescinded. As a result, the French football league withdrew the second yellow card.

Sevilla
On 31 May 2019, Spanish club Sevilla FC announced it had reached an agreement with Nantes for the transfer of Carlos. He made his debut in a 2–0 away victory over Espanyol.

Carlos was part of the club's successful 2019–20 UEFA Europa League campaign. In the run-up to the final, he conceded penalties in both of Sevilla's quarter-final and semi-final matches against Wolverhampton Wanderers and Manchester United,  respectively and then also gave away a penalty early on in the final itself against Inter Milan on 21 August 2020. He had a hand in the game-winning goal as his overhead kick was turned into the net by Romelu Lukaku.

In the 2021–22 season, Sevilla went on to have one of the strongest defenses in La Liga and across Europe's top leagues, with Carlos' leadership at centre-back being cited as one of the reasons for this. Because of that, Carlos began to attract the interest of several clubs across Europe, with English clubs Newcastle United and West Ham United reportedly attempting to sign him in the January transfer window of 2022.

Aston Villa
On 26 May 2022, English club Aston Villa announced they had reached an agreement with Sevilla for Carlos' transfer. The fee was undisclosed by the club but was reported to be £26 million. Ahead of his first season with Aston Villa, he was named by manager Steven Gerrard as one of two vice-captains, alongside Emiliano Martínez. On 6 August, he made his debut for the club in the Premier League in 2-0 away loss against Bournemouth.  On 13 August, he made his Villa Park debut in a 2–1 victory over Everton. In the same game, he ruptured his achilles tendon, which saw him requiring surgery.

International career
On 3 November 2020, Carlos received a late call-up to the Brazil squad for two 2022 FIFA World Cup qualifying matches against Venezuela and Uruguay.

On 17 June 2021, Carlos was named to the Brazilian squad for the 2020 Summer Olympics.

Career statistics

Honours
Sevilla
UEFA Europa League: 2019–20

Brazil Olympic
Summer Olympics: 2020

References

External links

 Profile at the Aston Villa F.C. website
 
 

Living people
1993 births
Brazilian footballers
Footballers from São Paulo (state)
Association football defenders
Desportivo Brasil players
São Paulo FC players
Paulista Futebol Clube players
Madureira Esporte Clube players
G.D. Estoril Praia players
FC Porto B players
FC Nantes players
Sevilla FC players
Aston Villa F.C. players
Campeonato Brasileiro Série C players
Primeira Liga players
Liga Portugal 2 players
Ligue 1 players
La Liga players
Premier League players
Brazilian expatriate footballers
Brazilian expatriate sportspeople in Portugal
Brazilian expatriate sportspeople in France
Brazilian expatriate sportspeople in Spain
Brazilian expatriate sportspeople in England
Expatriate footballers in Portugal
Expatriate footballers in France
Expatriate footballers in Spain
Expatriate footballers in England
UEFA Europa League winning players
Olympic footballers of Brazil
Footballers at the 2020 Summer Olympics
Olympic medalists in football
Olympic gold medalists for Brazil
Medalists at the 2020 Summer Olympics
People from Barra Bonita, São Paulo